{{DISPLAYTITLE:C18H36O}}
The molecular formula C18H36O (molar mass: 268.48 g/mol, exact mass: 268.2766 u) may refer to:

 Octadecanal
 Oleyl alcohol, or octadecenol